Whitcombe or Whitcomb may refer to:

People
Whitcombe (surname)
George Faunce Whitcomb
Ian Whitcomb (1941-2020)

Places
United Kingdom
 Whitcombe, Dorset, England
 Whitcombe, Somerset, England
United States
 Whitcomb, Indiana
 Whitcomb, Wisconsin

Other
 Whitcomb Locomotive Works